Maurice Allard (January 2, 1922 – September 14, 1988) was a Canadian politician, as well as a law professor and a lawyer. He was elected in 1958 as a member of the Progressive Conservative Party representing the riding of Sherbrooke. He ran as an Independent Progressive Conservative and was defeated in the same riding in 1962. Allard quit the Progressive Conservative party in 1963 due to his opposition to party leader John Diefenbaker.  He was elected in 1965 as an Independent Progressive Conservative and remained in the House of Commons until as such until resigning on March 6, 1968. Allard was born in Sherbrooke, Quebec.

References

External links 
 

1922 births
1988 deaths
Members of the House of Commons of Canada from Quebec
Politicians from Sherbrooke
Progressive Conservative Party of Canada MPs
20th-century Canadian lawyers